The Church of Nuestra Señora de Las Mercedes is a colonial Gothic church located in Santo Domingo, Dominican Republic. 

It is part of the UNESCO World Heritage Site "Colonial City of Santo Domingo".

The construction of this religious building began in the year 1549, and was completed in 1616, built by Rodrigo de Liendo. It was an ancient seminary, later a monastery. This building was seriously damaged during the invasion of the English corsair Sir Francis Drake in 1586.

The Church of Nuestra Señora de Las Mercedes has a wide vaulted nave with side chapels located between its buttresses. It has a high choir, an octagonal apse and a high altar in the Baroque style. It is notable for its wooden pulpit which is supported by a support in the form of a serpent demon.

Virgin of Las Mercedes
In the year 1616, the swearing-in of the Patronage of la Virgen de las Mercedes was made in this church, which was extended to the entire Dominican Republic, and the dedication to the Virgin of las Mercedes is proclaimed that same year. The colonial image of the Virgen de las Mercedes found on the altar of this church is taken out every September 24, celebrating the day of Virgin of Las Mercedes, patron saint of the Dominican Republic.

Gallery

See also
List of colonial buildings in Santo Domingo

References

Roman Catholic churches in Santo Domingo
Roman Catholic churches completed in 1616
Spanish Colonial architecture in the Dominican Republic
1549 establishments in the Spanish Empire
Gothic architecture in the Dominican Republic
Ciudad Colonial (Santo Domingo)